The Billboard Top Latin albums chart, published in Billboard magazine, is a record chart that features Latin music sales information. This data are compiled by Nielsen SoundScan from a sample that includes music stores, music departments at electronics and department stores, Internet sales (both physical and digital) and verifiable sales from concert venues in the United States.

There were thirteen number-one albums on this chart in 2006. The best-selling Latin album was Barrio Fino en Directo by Daddy Yankee. This album debuted at number 24 in the Billboard 200 in the last week of 2005; it spent 13 weeks at the top of the chart, more than any other number-one albums in the chart. Now Latino also peaked at number one, spending seven non-consecutive weeks at this position; this compilation album includes music by Aventura, Don Omar, Juanes, La 5ª Estación, Kumbia Kings, Chayanne, Wisin & Yandel, Bebe, Ricardo Arjona, Luis Fonsi, Thalía, Alexis & Fido, Zion & Lennox, Angel & Khriz, Cristian Castro, Reik, Sin Bandera and Alejandro Fernández.

MTV Unplugged by Ricky Martin spent one week at the top of the chart on November 22, 2006, and won the Latin Grammy Award for Best Male Pop Vocal Album; this album was replaced at number one by Navidades by Luis Miguel, an album that received a Grammy Award nomination for Best Latin Pop Vocal Album. With the highest charting debut by a reggaeton artist, Don Omar's King of Kings entered at number seven on the Billboard 200 with 68,000 units sold. This album also peaked at number one for 11 weeks on this chart.

Mexican rock band Maná, with his first studio album since 2002, Amar Es Combatir, entered the Billboard 200 at number four, making it the highest-charting debut for a Spanish-language album for a duo or group. With 30,000 units sold in its first week, Paulina Rubio debuted at number 25 in the Billboard 200 and achieved her third number-one album on this chart with Ananda, after her albums Paulina and Pau-Latina accomplished it in 2001 and 2004, respectively. Luny Tunes and Tainy with Mas Flow: Los Benjamins and Héctor el Father with Los Rompe Discotekas peaked at number one for the first time in their careers. With Trozos de Mi Alma, Vol. 2, singer-songwriter Marco Antonio Solís peaked at number one for the sixth time in his career.

Albums

References

2006 Latin
United States Latin Albums
2006 in Latin music